The term Archeparchy of Mosul may refer to:

 Archeparchy of Mosul (Church of the East), a historical archeparchy (archdiocese) of the Church of the East, in Mosul (Iraq)
 Chaldean Catholic Archeparchy of Mosul, an archeparchy (archdiocese) of the Chaldean Catholic Church, in Mosul (Iraq)
 Syrian Catholic Archeparchy of Mosul, an archeparchy (archdiocese) of the Syrian Catholic Church, in Mosul (Iraq)

See also
 Mosul
 Archeparchy of Erbil (disambiguation)
 Archeparchy of Baghdad (disambiguation)
 Archeparchies of the Church of the East